Syrdarya Power Plant is a natural gas-fired power plant located in Shirin, Uzbekistan.  Its ten units were commissioned in 1972–1981.  The installed capacity of the power plant is 3,050 MW.

Modernization of the Syrdarya Power Plant a been financed by international donors.  The European Bank for Reconstruction and Development in cooperation with the Asian Development Bank financed reconstruction of two generation units by Siemens.  In 2000, the Syrdarya Energy Company, now part of Uzbekenergo, was created on the basis of the Syrdarya Power Plant.

See also
List of towers
List of chimneys
List of tallest freestanding structures in the world

References

Buildings and structures completed in 1972
1972 in the Soviet Union
Natural gas-fired power stations in Uzbekistan
Power stations built in the Soviet Union